"Who Do You Think You Are?" is the third single from English singer Kim Wilde's eighth studio album, Love Is (1992). The previous single, "Heart Over Mind", had only been released in the United Kingdom, making this the second international single. The song was remixed from its original album form for its release, and several longer remixes are included on the 12-inch and CD single formats. A remix of "Try Again" from Love Is was used as the B-side in the UK while other countries used "I've Found a Reason", an exclusive non-album track, previously used as the B-side to "Heart Over Mind". A remix of "Heart Over Mind" also appears on the UK CD single.

Critical reception
Lennox Herald described the song as "bright, breezy pop" in their review.

Music video
A music video was made to accompany the song, directed by Greg Masuak. It was published on YouTube in September 2013. By November 2020, the video has been viewed over 864 000 times.

Track listings
7-inch
 "Who Do You Think You Are?" – 3:46
 "Try Again" (club mix) – 4:29

CD 1
 "Who Do You Think You Are?" (7-inch version) – 3:46
 "Try Again" (club mix) – 4:29
 "Who Do You Think You Are?" (Bruce Forest 12-inch mix) – 7:56
 "Who Do You Think You Are?" (Bruce Forest dub mix) – 5:31

CD 2
 "Who Do You Think You Are?" (7-inch version) – 3:46
 "Who Do You Think You Are?" (extended version) – 5:38
 "Heart Over Mind" (club mix) – 4:28
 "Never Trust A Stranger" (7-inch version) – 4:05

Charts

Release history

References

Kim Wilde songs
1992 songs
Songs written by Ricky Wilde
Songs written by Kim Wilde
1992 singles
MCA Records singles